Tojo may refer to:

Places
Tōjō, Hiroshima, Japan, a town
Tōjō, Hyōgo, Japan, a town merged with others to form the city of Katō
Tōjō Station (Aichi), a railway station in Toyokawa, Aichi Prefecture, Japan
Tōjō Station (Hiroshima), a railway station in Kawatō, Tōjō-chō, Shōbara, Hiroshima Prefecture, Japan
Tojo, Sulawesi, a district in Tojo Una-Una Regency, Sulawesi, Indonesia

People
Hideki Tojo (1884–1948), Japanese politician, general, convicted war criminal, and Prime Minister of Japan during World War II
Yūko Tojo (1939-2013), Granddaughter of general Tojo and ultra-nationalist politician.
Tojo Yamamoto (1927–1992), ring name of American professional wrestler Harold Watanabe
Generoso Jiménez (1917–2007), better known as Tojo, Cuban trombonist
Martin Kendrick (1948-2016), better known as Tojo The Dwarf, subject of graffiti on the West Midlands canal and railways

Other uses
 Tōbu Tōjō Line, a railway line in Tokyo and Saitama Prefecture, Japan
 Tōjō (surname), a Japanese surname
 "Tojo" (song), a 1983 song by Hoodoo Gurus from Stoneage Romeos
 Nakajima Ki-44, codename Tojo, a Japanese World War II fighter aircraft